Trade Wind Airport  is an airfield in Oak Bluffs, Massachusetts, located in Dukes County on the Island of Martha's Vineyard.

The airfield has been in operation since at least 1938. It has two turf runways, numbered 6/24 and 13/31. Only runway 6/24 is currently in use. There is a hangar on the property, but there are currently no fueling or hangar facilities available. No overnight parking of planes is allowed, so planes must leave the same day. Aircraft wishing to park overnight use one of the other two airports on the island, Martha's Vineyard Airport or Katama Airpark.

The airport is on 71.9 acres of land known as the Trade Wind Fields Preserve, and is owned and operated by the Martha's Vineyard Land Bank Commission.

The airport is privately owned, public use. Landing is allowed only after receiving a permission-to-land email from the Land Bank. Pilots request permission in advance using a form on the Land Bank's web site. Permission-to-land emails are valid until December 31 and must be renewed annually.

References

External links
 Web site of Martha's Vineyard Land Bank Commission
 Land Bank page about the Trade Wind property
 Map of the property showing hiking trails
 Airport data page at skyvector.com
 Airport data page at AOPA.org

Defunct airports in Massachusetts
Buildings and structures in Oak Bluffs, Massachusetts
Airports in Dukes County, Massachusetts